This is a collection of lists of early settlers (before 1700) in the Colony of Rhode Island and Providence Plantations.  Most of the lists are of the earliest inhabitants of a particular town or area.

Indian tribes and leaders 

The following people lived in Rhode Island prior to Colonial settlement:

Wampanoag people lived throughout Plymouth Colony and around Mount Hope Bay in Bristol, Rhode Island

Massasoit, tribal leader, met the Pilgrims at Plymouth
Wamsutta, son of Massasoit, became tribal leader upon father's death but died shortly after
Metacomet, son of Massasoit, succeeded his brother as tribal leader; colonists gave him the name of Philip, at his request; instigated King Philip's War

Narragansett people lived throughout the Rhode Island colony

Canonicus, chief sachem, deeded the land to Roger Williams on which he established Providence Plantations
Miantonomo, nephew of Canonicus, sold Samuel Gorton and others the land to establish Warwick, Rhode Island
Canonchet, son of Miantonomo, led Narragansets during the Great Swamp Fight and accepted his own death at the end of King Philip's War
Pumham, lesser sachem of Kent County, Rhode Island
Soconoco, lesser sachem of the same area as Pumham

Niantic people lived around the Pawcatuck River in the southwestern corner of Rhode Island

Ninigret, kept the Niantics neutral during King Philip's War
Harman Garrett, Indian governor, and nephew of Ninigret
Nipmuc people wandered within Rhode Island Colony, mostly from the north

First European settler 

William Blackstone, settled along the Blackstone River in Cumberland, Rhode Island (1634–35), part of the Plymouth Colony at the time

First settlers of Providence  

Roger Williams was banished from the Massachusetts Bay Colony in October 1635 but was allowed to remain at his home in  Salem, Massachusetts until the end of winter, provided that he did not preach.  However, his followers visited him at his home in sizable numbers, and the authorities deemed this to be preaching. They planned to apprehend him by force and put him on a ship for England in January 1636, but magistrate John Winthrop warned him privately, and he slipped away from Salem in the dead of winter to find shelter with the Wampanoags.  He bought a parcel of land in Seekonk from Wampanoag sachem Massasoit which was at the western edge of the Plymouth Colony (now Rehoboth, Massachusetts).  In a 1677 statement, Williams mentioned the four who were with him at Seekonk.  The five members of the group were:

Roger Williams
William Harris
John Smith (miller)
Francis Wickes (a minor)
Thomas Angell (a minor)

In the spring of 1636, Williams and his company planted crops at Seekonk but were informed in a gentle letter from Governor Edward Winslow of Plymouth that they were within Plymouth's jurisdiction, and this fact would cause difficulties with the Massachusetts authorities.  Without urgency, Winslow suggested that Williams and his group move across the Seekonk River into the territory of the Narragansetts, where no colony had any claim.  Joshua Verin wrote a statement in 1650 mentioning "we six which came first to Providence", suggesting that he was the next to join the original five.  Also, Benedict Arnold later wrote, "Memm. We came to Providence to Dwell the 20th of April, 1636". While the traditional date of the settlement of Providence has been given as about 20 June 1636, this does not take into account the Arnold record.  More recent analysis of the settling of Providence suggests that Williams likely negotiated with the Narragansetts for land in March 1636, and that Williams and his party along with the Arnold family actually settled the land in April 1636.  It is likely that the following people were the original settlers in the Narragansett territory at the place which Williams named Providence Plantations:

Roger Williams (his wife Mary and daughters Mary and Freeborn likely came later)
William Harris (his wife Susannah and son Andrew likely came later)
John Smith (his wife Alice and children John Jr. and Elizabeth likely came later)
Francis Wickes (a minor)
Thomas Angell (a minor)
Joshua Verin (his wife Jane may have come later);
The Arnold party, including:
William Arnold with wife Christian, daughter Joanne, and sons Stephen and Benedict
William Carpenter with wife Elizabeth (the daughter of William Arnold)
William Mann with wife Frances Hopkins (the niece of William Arnold)
Thomas Hopkins, still a minor, nephew of William Arnold (and ancestor of Governor Stephen Hopkins)

Providence civil compact, 1637 

Several young men were admitted as inhabitants to Providence before the settlement was a year old, but they were discontented with their position and wanted to be able to vote and otherwise have equality with the older settlers.  The following resolution was adopted in a town meeting on August 20, 1637 and is sometimes called the "civil compact."  The 1637 date was on the original town records, but when they were transcribed in 1800, the page containing that date was missing.  The text of the resolution is as follows:
We, whose names are hereunder, desirous to inhabit in the town of Providence, do promise to subject ourselves in active or passive obedience to all such orders or agreements as shall be made for public good of our body, in an orderly way, by the major assent of the present inhabitants, master of families, incorporated together into a town fellowship, and others whom they shall admit unto them only in civil things.

Richard Scott
William Reynolds X his mark
John Field X his mark
Chad Browne
John Warner
George Richard
Edward Cope
Thomas Angell X his mark (now an adult)
Thomas Harris
Francis Wickes X his mark (now an adult)
Benedict Arnold (now an adult)
Joshua Winsor
William Wickenden

Original proprietors of Providence 

Those named in a deed from Roger Williams, dated about October 8, 1638:

Roger Williams
Stukeley Westcott (left Salem about March 1638)
William Arnold
Thomas James (was minister at Charlestown; Providence by June 1637; left for New Haven in 1639)
Robert Coles (was earlier at Roxbury, Ipswich, and Salem)
John Greene (had departed Boston by March 1636)
John Throckmorton (was at Salem earlier)
John Sweet
William Harris
William Carpenter
Thomas Olney (left Salem about March 1638)
Francis Weston (left Salem about March 1638)
Richard Waterman (left Salem about March 1638)
Ezekiel Holyman (left Salem about March 1638)

Pawtuxet settlers 

Those settlers who left Providence to settle on the north side of the Pawtuxet River about 1638, putting themselves under the jurisdiction of Massachusetts Bay Colony from 1642 to 1658:

William Arnold
Benedict Arnold, moved to Newport in 1651
William Carpenter
Thomas Hopkins, did not stay long
William Mann, did not stay long
Robert Coles
William Harris, did not stay long
Zachariah Rhodes (married Joanna, daughter of William Arnold), did not stay long
William Field, did not stay long
Stukeley Westcott, moved to Warwick about 1643

Signers of Providence agreement for a government, 1640 

Those 39 Providence settlers who signed an agreement to form a government on July 27, 1640:

Chad Brown
Robert Coles
William Harris
John Throckmorton
Stukely Westcott
Benedict Arnold
William Carpenter
Richard Scott
Thomas Harris
Francis Wickes X his mark
Thomas Angell X his mark
Adam Goodwin X his mark
William Burrows X his mark
Roger Williams
Robert West
Joshua Winsor
Robert Williams
Mathew Waller
Gregory Dexter
John Lippitt X his mark
John Warner
John Field
William Arnold
William Field
Edward Cope
Edward Manton X his mark
William Man
Nicholas Power
William Reynolds X his mark
Thomas Olney
Richard Waterman
William Wickenden
Edward Hart
Hugh Bewit
Thomas Hopkins X his mark
Joan Tiler (widow)
Jane Sears X her mark (widow)
Christopher Unthank
William Hawkins X his mark

Settlers of Cocumscussoc (Wickford) area 

Those early settlers who had trading posts in the area of Wickford in what was then the "Narragansett country" and later a part of North Kingstown, Rhode Island:

Richard Smith, built a trading post established about 1637 where his house Smith's Castle still stands, rebuilt by Richard, Jr. after King Philip's War
Roger Williams, built his trading post about a mile north from Smith's post along the Pequot Path (or Post Road) and occupied it from about 1644 to 1651 and then sold it to Smith to get funds for his proposed errand to England
Mr. Wilcox (possibly Edward or John), built his trading post in the early 1640s in the same general area

Founders of Portsmouth 

Supporters of Anne Hutchinson who signed the Portsmouth Compact, dated March 7, 1638:

William Coddington
John Clarke
William Hutchinson, husband of Anne Hutchinson
John Coggeshall
William Aspinwall
Samuel Wilbore
John Porter
John Sanford
Edward Hutchinson, Jr., oldest son of William and Anne Hutchinson
Thomas Savage
William Dyer, husband of Mary Dyer
William Freeborn
Philip Shearman
John Walker
Richard Carder
William Baulston
Edward Hutchinson, Sr., brother of William Hutchinson
Henry Bull (signed with a mark)
Randall Holden
Thomas Clarke
John Johnson
William Hall
John Brightman

The last four names on the list were crossed out, but these men nevertheless came to Portsmouth or Newport.

Inhabitants of Aquidneck Island (1638) 

The following individuals were among the earliest settlers of Aquidneck Island in the Narragansett Bay; the island was officially named Rhode Island by 1644, from which the entire colony eventually took its name.  The first group of 58 names appears to be settlers of Pocasset (later Portsmouth), while the second group of 42 appears to be settlers of Newport.  These two lists come from Bartlett's Records of the Colony of Rhode Island, and apparently they were compiled and incorporated into the town records of Newport on November 25, 1639.  The actual arrival dates of the individuals likely span over several months during 1638; a few individuals have legible dates next to their names, while several others have illegible dates.

A Catalogue of such who, by the Generall consent of the Company were admitted to be Inhabytants of the Island now called Aqueedneck, having submitted themselves to the Government that is or shall be established, according to the word of God therein [1638]

Samuel Hutchinson
Thomas Emons
Richard Awards
Edward Willcoks
George Gardiner
William Witherington
Mr. Samuel Gorton
John Wickes
Ralph Earle
Nicholas Browne 
Richard Burden [Borden]
Richard Maxon
Mr. Nicholas Esson
Thomas Spicer
Robert Potter
William Nedham
Sampson Shatton 	
Adam Mott
John Mott
Mr. Robert Jefferyes
Thomas Hitt
James Tarr
John Roome
Robert Gilham 
Jeremy Clarke 
Nicholas Davis
Wm. Baker
John More
Anthony Pain
George Potter	
Wm. Richardson
Wm. Quick
Thomas Clarke
John Johnson
William Hall
John Briggs
James Davis 
George Parker
Erasmus Bullock
George Cleer
Thomas Hazard
William Cowlie
Jeffery Champlin
Richard Sarle
John Sloff
Thomas Beeder
John Tripp
Osamund Doutch
John Marshall
Robert Stanton
Joseph Clarke
Robert Carr
George Layton
John Arnold
William Havens
Thomas Layton
Edward Poole
Mathew Sutherland	
	

"Inhabitants admitted at the Town of Nieu-port since the 20th of the 3:1638" (since 20 May 1638)

Marmaduke Ward
Robert Field
Thomas Stafford
Job Tyler
Thomas Sauorie
Hugh Durdall
William Baker
John Layton
Mr. Will Foster
John Hall
Tobye Knight
John Peckum
Michel Williamson
Mr. Robert Lintell
Richard Smith
James Rogers
John Smith
Wm. Parker
John Grinman
Edward Rero
John Macummore
Robert Root
Ezekiah Meritt
James Burt
John Bartlett 	
Edward _
Sampson Salter
Nicholas Cottrell
John Vaughan
John Smith
John Merchant (2 July)
Jeremy Gould 
Enoch Hunt
Nathaniel Adams 	
Samuel Allen
George Allen
Ralph Allen
Mr. Thomas Burton
Henry Bishop
John Hicks
Edward Browce
Mathew Gridell (5 August)

Residents of Portsmouth after split with Newport 

Those Portsmouth settlers who remained after the group left to found Newport and who signed an agreement for a government on April 30, 1639:

William Hutchinson
Samuel Gorton
Samuel Hutchinson, did not stay long if actually here
John Wickes
Richard Magson
Thomas Spicer
John Roome
John Geoffe (?)
Thomas Beddar
Erasmus Bullock
Samson Shotten
Ralphe Earle
Robert Potter
Nathaniel Potter
George Potter
William Havens
George Shaw
George Lawton
Anthony Paine
Job Hawkins
Richard Awarde
John Moore
Nicholas Browne
William Richardson
John Tripp
Thomas Layton
Robert Stanton
John Briggs
James Davis
William Aspinwall (did not sign agreement, but did remain here)

Founders of Newport 

Those who signed an agreement for a new government on April 28, 1639:

William Coddington
Nicholas Easton
John Coggeshall
William Brenton
John Clarke
Jeremy Clarke (his wife was Frances (Latham) Clarke)
Thomas Hazard
Henry Bull
William Dyer

Founders of Warwick 

Those who purchased the land from the Indians on January 12, 1642:

Randall Holden
John Greene
John Wickes
Francis Weston
Samuel Gorton
Richard Waterman
John Warner
Richard Carder
Samson Shotten
Robert Potter
William Wodell
Nicholas Power
John Sweet

Pettaquamscutt purchasers 

Those who purchased the Pettaquamscutt lands (later South Kingstown) from the Indian sachems in 1657:

Original purchasers:
John Porter
Samuel Wilbore
Thomas Mumford
Samuel Wilson
John Hull (Boston goldsmith and minter)

Later purchasers:
William Brenton
Benedict Arnold

In 1659 a second group set up the Atherton Trading Company, with perceived rights to land in Narragansett, in an area south of the North Kingstown, which included Wickford. Their claim was declared void years later.

Early inhabitants of New Shoreham (Block Island) 

The original purchasers of Block Island in April 1661, whose names appear on a plaque at the north end of the island:

 Thomas Terry
 John Clarke
 William Jud
 Samuel Dearing
 Simon Ray
 William Tosh
 Tormut Rose
 William Barker
 Daniel Cumball
 William Cohoone
 Duncan Mack Williamson
 John Rathbun
 Edward Vorce, Jun.
 Trustrum Dodge, Sen.
 Nicholas White
 William Billings
 John Ackurs (Acres).

The early settlers whose names appear on the plaque:

 Richard Billingum
 Samuel Dearing
 Nathaniel Winslow
 Tormut Rose
 Edward Vorce
 John Rathbun
 Thomas Faxson
 Richard Allis
 Phillip Warton
 John Glover
 Thomas Terry
 James Sands
 Hugh Williams
 John Alcock
 Peter George
 Simon Ray
 Trustrum Dodge was also an early settler, though his name only appears on the plaque as an original purchaser

Those named in the Royal Charter of 1663 

The early Rhode Island inhabitants named in the Rhode Island Royal Charter, dated July 8, 1663 and signed with the royal seal by King Charles II; this charter was the basis for Rhode Island's government for nearly two centuries:

Author:  John Clarke
Governor:  Benedict Arnold
Deputy Governor:  William Brenton

Assistants:

William Baulston
John Porter
Roger Williams
Thomas Olney
John Smith
John Greene
John Coggeshall
James Barker
William Field
Joseph Clarke

Others named in the document:

William Codington
Nicholas Easton
Samuel Gorton
John Wickes
Gregory Dexter
Randall Holden
John Roome
Samuel Wildbore
Richard Tew
Thomas Harris
William Dyre
 Rainsborrow (given name omitted)
 Williams (this is undoubtedly Robert Williams, brother of Roger Williams)
John Nickson

Early inhabitants of Westerly 

Westerly, at first called Misquamicut, was purchased on 27 August 1661 by the following Newport men:

 William Vaughan
 John Coggeshall, Jr.
 John Crandall
 Hugh Mosher
 James Barker
 Caleb Carr
 James Rogers
 Joseph Torry
 John Cranston

Of these men, only John Crandall appears to have settled in Westerly.

Westerly inhabitants appearing in the town records of 18 May 1669:

 John Crandall
 Edward Larkin
 Stephen Wilcox
 John Lewis
 James Cross
 Jonathan Armstrong
 John Maxson
 Jeffrey Champlin, Sr.
 John Fairfield
 Daniel Cromb
 Nicholas Cottrell
 Shubael Painter
 Tobias Saunders
 Robert Burdick
 John Randall
 John MacCoon
 John Sharp
 Daniel Stanton
 James Babcock, Sr.
 Thomas Painter
 James Babcock, Jr.
 John Babcock
 Job Babcock
 Josiah Clarke

Colonial leaders during King Philip's War 

 Benedict Arnold
 John Clarke
 James Barker
 Obadiah Holmes
 William Vaughan
 William Hiscocks
 Christopher Holder
 Phillip Shearman
 Capt. John Albro
 William Wodell
 George Lawton
 Robert Hodgson
 William Carpenter
 Gregory Dexter
 Capt. Randall Holden
 Capt. John Greene

Original proprietors of East Greenwich 

At a meeting of the General Assembly in Newport in May 1677, the following 48 individuals were granted 100-acre tracts in East Greenwich "for the services rendered during King Philip's War."

John Spencer
Thomas Nichols, father of Deputy Governor Jonathan Nichols
Clement Weaver
Henry Brightman
George Vaughan
John Weaver
Charles Macarty
Thomas Wood
Thomas Frye, father of Deputy Governor Thomas Frye
Benjamin Griffin
Daniel Vaughan
Thomas Dungan, son of William and Frances (Latham) Dungan
John Pearce
Stephen Peckham
John Crandall, son of John Crandall
Preserved Pearce
Henry Lilly
John Albro, son of John Albro
Samuel Albro, son of John Albro
Philip Long
Richard Knight
John Peckham
Thomas Peckham
William Clarke
Edward Day
Edward Richmond
Edward Calvery
John Heath
Robert Havens
John Strainge
John Parker
George Browne
Richard Barnes
Samson Ballou
John Remington
Jonathan Devell
Benjamin Mowrey
Joseph Mowrey
William Wilbore, cousin of Samuel Wilbore
James Eyles Pearce
James Batty
Benjamin Gorton, son of Samuel Gorton
Henry Dyre, son of William and Mary Dyer
John Knowles
Stephen Arnold, son of William Arnold and brother of Governor Benedict Arnold
John Sanford, son of Governor John Sanford
William Hawkins
John Holden, son of Randall Holden

Early Settlers of Bristol (1680) 
Bristol's early history began as a commercial enterprise when John Gorham was awarded 100 acres of land if it could be "honorably purchased from the indians." Gorham's enterprise succeeded on 18 Sep 1680 when four proprietors were awarded the deed to Mt. Hope Lands: 
John Walley
Nathaniel Byfield
Stephen Burton
Nathaniel Oliver (sold share to Nathan Hayman)
Nathan Hayman

On 27 Aug 1680, twelve men signed Articles agreeing to purchase lands:
Capt. Benjamin Church
Doctor Isaac Waldron
Timothy Clarke
William Ingraham
Nathaniel Paine
Nathaniel Reynolds
Christopher Saunders
John Wilkins
Nathaniel Williams
Samuel Woodbury
Nathaniel Bosworth
Benjamin Jones

On 1 Sep 1681, more than 60 families were present at the first town meeting and named these lands Bristol after Bristol, England. Bristol was originally part of Massachusetts, but it became part of Rhode Island when disputed lands were awarded to the Colony of Rhode Island in 1747.

Eliashib Adams
Watching Atherton
Joseph Baster
John Bayley
John Birge
Thomas Bletsoe
Benjamin Bosworth
Edward Bosworth
William Brenton
William Brown
James Burrill
James Burroughs (Burrows)
David Cary (Carey)
John Cary (Carey)
Samuel Cobbett
John Corps (Cope)
Solomon Curtis
Zachariah Curtis
Thomas Daggett
Jonathan Davenport
Robert Dutch
Jeremiah Finney
John Finney
Jonathan Finney
Joseph Ford
Anthony Fry
Samuel Gallop
John Gladding
Jabez Gorham
Richard Hammond
Henry Hampton
William Hedge
William Hoar
Jabez Howland
Benjamin Ingell (Ingalls)
Joseph Jacob(s)
Daniel Landon (Langdon)
Thomas Lewis
John Martin Jr.
Nicholas Mead
George Morye (Mowrey)
Jeremiah Osborne
Peter Pampelion (Papillon)
Samuel Penfield
John Pope
Edmund Ranger
Increase Robinson
John Rogers
John Saffin
Joseph Sandy
John Smith
Richard Smith
Widdo (Elizabeth) Southard (Southworth)
Robert Taft
Major Robert Thompson
William Throope
John Thurston
George Waldron
Thomas Walker
Uzal/Uzell Wardwell
Richard White
John Wilson
Hugh Woodbury

Settlers of Frenchtown 

French Huguenots settled in what is now East Greenwich in 1687.  On 12 October 1686, an agreement was signed between the following, representing the French settlers and the land owners:

Representing Land Owners
 Richard Wharton
 Elisha Hutchinson (son of Edward Hutchinson)
 John Saffin

Representing Huguenot Settlers
 Ezechiel Carre'
 Peter Le Breton

Those who signed the agreement

The following individuals signed the follow-on agreement, usually giving only their surname, and these same names are found on a plat map of the settlement.

William Barbret
Paul Collin
Jean Germon
Dechamps
Fougere
Grignon
Legare'
Robineau
Petter Ayrault
Magni, Junior
Magni, Senior
Dauid, Junior
Dauid, Senior
Chadene
foretier
Ezechiel Carre', Ministre
Louis Alaire
Jamain
Bussereau
Le moine (Moses LeMoine, father of Colonel Peter Mawney)
Abraum tourtellot
La Veue Galay
Targe', Junior
Targe', Senior
Grasilier
Amian
Lafou
Belhair
Milard
Jouet
Renaud
Le gendre
Bertin dit Laronde
Menardeau
Galay
Ratier
Dauid
Beauchamps
Moize le Brun
Le Breton
La Vigne
Tauerrier
Bouniot
Arnaud
Lambert
Rambert
Coudret
Jean Julien

Also on the map are two additional lots:  "La terre pour L'Eglise" (land for the church) and "La terr pour L'ecolle" (land for the school).  Almost all of these people left Rhode Island to settle in Massachusetts and New York following some severe civil clashes with the English settlers.  Two families remained on their original land, however:

LeMoine (later anglicized to Money, and then Mawney)
Targe' (which became Tourgee)

The Ayrault family moved to Newport.

Other prominent early settlers (pre-1700) 

 Jireh Bull, early settler of Pettaquamscutt (South Kingstown)
 Thomas Cornell (settler)
 Joseph Jenckes Jr., early settler of Pawtucket, Warwick, and Providence
 Stephen Northup, built house that remains as one of oldest in the state
 John Steere, early settler of Providence and Smithfield, Rhode Island
 Pardon Tillinghast, early pastor of the First Baptist Church in America
 John Whipple, early settler of Providence
 Reverend William Vaughn, first Baptist minister of Newport
 Reverend Thomas Dungan, Baptist minister of Newport
 Captain Arthur Fenner, established RI boundaries, military leader of the Providence Plantations during King Phillip's War

See also

 History of Rhode Island
 Colony of Rhode Island and Providence Plantations

References

External links 
Early Rhode Island maps
Original purchasers and settlers of Block Island

Settlers
Pre-statehood history of Rhode Island
People of colonial Rhode Island